Rhyzodiastes mindoro is a species of ground beetle in the subfamily Rhysodinae. It was described by R.T. & J.R. Bell in 2000.

References

Rhyzodiastes
Beetles described in 2000